Xing Zhaotang (1894–1961) original name Guangzu, courtesy name Zhaotang, was a People's Republic of China politician. He was born in Tongwei County, Gansu Province. A veteran of the Second Zhili–Fengtian War, he was a regiment commander in the Guominjun. In 1927, he became a division commander in the National Revolutionary Army's 6th Division. Xing joined the opposition to Chiang Kai-shek. After the beginning of the Second Sino-Japanese War, Xing and Sun Dianying created a guerrilla force in northern Hebei Province and Chahar Province. This was absorbed into the National Revolutionary Army in 1939 as the New 5th Army, with Xing as deputy army commander. During the Chinese Civil War, Xing sided with the Chinese Communist Party against the Kuomintang due to opposition to Chiang. He was made vice chairman of Ningxia in 1949, chairman in 1952 and vice governor of Henan Province in 1955.

References

1894 births
1961 deaths
People's Republic of China politicians from Gansu
Chinese Communist Party politicians from Gansu
Political office-holders in Ningxia
Political office-holders in Henan
People from Dingxi